The Haifa subdistrict is one of Israel's sub-districts in Haifa District. The subdistrict is composed of mostly of the Northern half of the historical Mandatory Haifa Subdistrict.

References